Zemplin Stadion is a multi-use stadium in Michalovce, Slovakia.  It is currently used mostly for football matches and is the home ground of MFK Zemplín Michalovce.  The stadium holds 4,440 people. The intensity of the floodlighting is 1,200 lux.

External links
Football stadiums profile

References

Football venues in Slovakia
Buildings and structures in Košice Region
Sport in Košice Region